Jorge Barajas  (born ) is a Mexican male volleyball player. He was part of the Mexico men's national volleyball team at the 2014 FIVB Volleyball Men's World Championship in Poland. The most recent club he played for was Bravos de Michoacán in 2019.

Clubs
 Tigres UANL (2014)
Panachaiki (2016-2017) 
Virtus Guanajuato (2016-2017)
Pag volley (2017-2018) 
Eilabun (2018-2019)
Bravos de Michoacán (2018-2019)

References

External links

 Player profile at volleybox.net

1991 births
Living people
Mexican men's volleyball players
Place of birth missing (living people)
Olympic volleyball players of Mexico
Volleyball players at the 2016 Summer Olympics